The 2014 Copa EuroAmericana was the second edition of the Copa EuroAmericana, a men's football friendly tournament created by DirecTV. This edition took place in various locations in the Americas from 20 July to 2 August 2014. Thirteen teams from CONMEBOL, CONCACAF and UEFA participated in the tournament. Europe, represented by the UEFA teams (Atlético Madrid, Fiorentina, Monaco and Valencia), won the cup by a 5–4 score, beating the Americas, represented by the CONCACAF and CONMEBOL teams (Alianza Lima, Atlético Nacional, América, Estudiantes, Junior, Palmeiras, San Jose Earthquakes, Universidad Católica and Universitario).

Format
Each match was played for 90 minutes. In case of a draw after regulation, the winner was determined via a penalty shoot-out. The confederation of the winning team for each match was awarded a point, and the confederation with the most points at the end of the tournament was crowned champions.

Participating teams

Venues

Standings

Matches

Top goalscorers

References

External links 
2014 Copa EuroAmericana: Official site
Footballzz.co.uk: Copa EuroAmericana 2014
Soccerway.com - 2014 Copa EuroAmericana

Copa EuroAmericana
2014 in South American football
Colombian football friendly trophies
Peruvian football friendly trophies
American soccer friendly trophies
Argentine football friendly trophies
Chilean football friendly trophies
Brazilian football friendly trophies